This is a list of Members of Parliament (MPs) elected in the 1847 general election.



See also 

 List of parliaments of the United Kingdom

References

External links 

 

1847
UK MPs 1847–1852
1847-related lists
1847 United Kingdom general election